John Young (born August 31, 1969) is an American former professional ice hockey and roller hockey center.

Career 
Young played professional ice hockey in the American Hockey League for the Rochester Americans and Cornwall Aces, the East Coast Hockey League for the Greensboro Monarchs and the International Hockey League for the Minnesota Moose.

Young also played roller hockey in Roller Hockey International. He began playing for the Minnesota Arctic Blast for the 1994 season, where he led the team in points with 79. He then played for the Minnesota Blue Ox in 1995 before returning to the Arctic Blast in 1996.

References

External links 

1969 births
Living people
American men's ice hockey centers
Cornwall Aces players
Ice hockey people from Saint Paul, Minnesota
Greensboro Monarchs players
Michigan Tech Huskies men's ice hockey players
Minnesota Arctic Blast players
Minnesota Blue Ox players
Minnesota Moose players
Rochester Americans players